

310001–310100 

|-bgcolor=#f2f2f2
| colspan=4 align=center | 
|}

310101–310200 

|-bgcolor=#f2f2f2
| colspan=4 align=center | 
|}

310201–310300 

|-id=222
| 310222 Vasipetropoulou ||  || Vasiliki Petropoulou (born 1982), a Greek astrophysicist. Her research includes the physical characteristics of near-Earth objects and the evolution of galaxy clusters. || 
|-id=273
| 310273 Paulsmeyers ||  || Paul Smeyers (born 1934), a Belgian astrophysicist and Professor at the Katholieke Universiteit Leuven || 
|}

310301–310400 

|-bgcolor=#f2f2f2
| colspan=4 align=center | 
|}

310401–310500 

|-bgcolor=#f2f2f2
| colspan=4 align=center | 
|}

310501–310600 

|-bgcolor=#f2f2f2
| colspan=4 align=center | 
|}

310601–310700 

|-id=652
| 310652 Hansjörgdittus ||  || Hansjörg Dittus (born 1957), a German physicist and Executive Board Member at the German Aerospace Center for Space Research and Technology during 2011–2021, where he contributed to the development of the small Mobile Asteroid Surface Scout (MASCOT) attached to the Japanese Hayabusa2 spacecraft which successfully landed on asteroid 162173 Ryugu in 2018. || 
|}

310701–310800 

|-bgcolor=#f2f2f2
| colspan=4 align=center | 
|}

310801–310900 

|-bgcolor=#f2f2f2
| colspan=4 align=center | 
|}

310901–311000 

|-bgcolor=#f2f2f2
| colspan=4 align=center | 
|}

References 

310001-311000